Sep. 15 - Eastern Orthodox liturgical calendar - Sep. 17

All fixed commemorations below celebrated on September 29 by Orthodox Churches on the Old Calendar.{{#tag:ref|The notation Old Style or (OS) is sometimes used to indicate a date in the Julian Calendar (which is used by churches on the Old Calendar").The notation New Style or (NS), indicates a date in the Revised Julian calendar (which is used by churches on the New Calendar").|group=note}}

For September 16th, Orthodox Churches on the Old Calendar commemorate the Saints listed on September 3.

Saints
 Saint Sebastiana, disciple of Apostle Paul, martyred at Heraclea (86)September 29 / September 16. HOLY TRINITY RUSSIAN ORTHODOX CHURCH (A parish of the Patriarchate of Moscow). 16 сентября по старому стилю  /  29 сентября по новому стилю. Русская Православная Церковь - Православный церковный календарь на  год.
 Martyr Melitina of Marcianopolis (c. 138-161) Συναξαριστής. 16 Σεπτεμβρίου. ECCLESIA.GR. (H ΕΚΚΛΗΣΙΑ ΤΗΣ ΕΛΛΑΔΟΣ).Martyr Melitina of Marcianopolis. OCA - Lives of the Saints.
 Great-martyr Euphemia the All-praised, of Chalcedon (304)Greatmartyr Euphemia the All-praised. OCA - Lives of the Saints. 
 Martyrs Victor and Sosthenes at Chalcedon (c. 304)
 Venerable Dorotheus, hermit of Egypt (4th century)Venerable Dorotheus the Hermit of Egypt. OCA - Lives of the Saints.
 New Martyrs Isaac and Joseph, at Karnu, Georgia (808)New Martyr Isaac of Georgia. OCA - Lives of the Saints.
 Martyr Ludmilla, grandmother of St. Wenceslaus, Prince of the Czechs (927)Great Synaxaristes:  Ἡ Ἁγία Λουντμίλα. 16 Σεπτεμβρίου. ΜΕΓΑΣ ΣΥΝΑΞΑΡΙΣΤΗΣ.

Pre-Schism Western saints
 Saint Cornelius, Pope of Rome (253)
 Hieromartyr Cyprian, Bishop of Carthage (258)  (see also: August 31 - East)
 Martyrs Lucy and Geminian, a widow and a neophyte martyred together in Rome under Diocletian (c. 300)  (see also: September 17 - East)
 Martyrs Abundius and Abundantius, and John and Marcianus, in Rome (c. 304)
 Saint Ninian, Bishop of Whithorn (Candida Casa), Apostle to the Southern Picts (c. 432)  (see also: August 26)
 Saint Curcodomus, successor of St Humbert as Abbot of Maroilles Abbey near Cambrai in France (c. 680)
 Virgin-martyr Dulcissima, venerated from time immemorial in Sutri in Italy.
 Saint Eugenia, Abbess of Hohenburg Abbey (735)
 Saints Rogelius and Servus-Dei, a monk and his young disciple martyred in Cordoba in Spain for publicly denouncing Islam (852)
 Saint Edith of Wilton, Nun, of Wilton Abbey (984)
 Saint Stephen of Perugia, third Abbot of St Peter in Perugia in Italy (1026)

Post-Schism Orthodox saints
 Venerable Kassianos of Glyfia near Alektora, in Cyprus, ascetic.
 Saint Cyprian, Metropolitan of Moscow and All Russia, Wonderworker (1406) 29 сентября (16 сентября). Православная Энциклопедия под редакцией Патриарха Московского и всея Руси Кирилла (электронная версия). (Orthodox Encyclopedia - Pravenc.ru).Repose of St Cyprian the Metropolitan of Moscow and All Russia. OCA - Lives of the Saints.
 Venerable Kuksha (Velichko) of Odessa, Hiero-Schemamonk of Odessa (1964)  (see also: December 11 - translation of relics)

New martyrs and confessors
 New Hieromartyr Gregory (Raevskii) of Tver, Priest (1937)New Hieromartyr Gregory (Raevskii) of Tver. OCA - Lives of the Saints.
 New Hieromartyr Sergius Losev, Priest (1942)

Other commemorations
 Icon of the Mother of God Support of Humble, near Pskov (1420)Icon of the Mother of God Support of Humble. OCA - Lives of the Saints.
 Translation of the relics (2001) of St. Alexis Mechev of Moscow (1923)

Icon gallery

Notes

References

Sources
 September 29 / September 16. HOLY TRINITY RUSSIAN ORTHODOX CHURCH (A parish of the Patriarchate of Moscow).
 September 16. OCA - The Lives of the Saints.
 The Autonomous Orthodox Metropolia of Western Europe and the Americas (ROCOR). St. Hilarion Calendar of Saints for the year of our Lord 2004. St. Hilarion Press (Austin, TX). p. 69.
 The Sixteenth Day of the Month of September. Orthodoxy in China.
 September 16. Latin Saints of the Orthodox Patriarchate of Rome.
 The Roman Martyrology. Transl. by the Archbishop of Baltimore. Last Edition, According to the Copy Printed at Rome in 1914. Revised Edition, with the Imprimatur of His Eminence Cardinal Gibbons. Baltimore: John Murphy Company, 1916. pp. 285–286.
 Rev. Richard Stanton. A Menology of England and Wales, or, Brief Memorials of the Ancient British and English Saints Arranged According to the Calendar, Together with the Martyrs of the 16th and 17th Centuries. London: Burns & Oates, 1892. p. 448-451.

 Greek Sources
 Great Synaxaristes:  16 ΣΕΠΤΕΜΒΡΙΟΥ. ΜΕΓΑΣ ΣΥΝΑΞΑΡΙΣΤΗΣ.
  Συναξαριστής. 16 Σεπτεμβρίου. ECCLESIA.GR. (H ΕΚΚΛΗΣΙΑ ΤΗΣ ΕΛΛΑΔΟΣ).
  16/09/.'' Ορθόδοξος Συναξαριστής.

 Russian Sources
  29 сентября (16 сентября). Православная Энциклопедия под редакцией Патриарха Московского и всея Руси Кирилла (электронная версия). (Orthodox Encyclopedia - Pravenc.ru).
  16 сентября по старому стилю  /  29 сентября по новому стилю. Русская Православная Церковь - Православный церковный календарь на  год.

September in the Eastern Orthodox calendar